The San Antonio Symphony was a full-time professional symphony orchestra based in San Antonio, Texas. Its season ran from late September to early June. Sebastian Lang-Lessing, its music director from 2010 to 2020, was the last to serve in that capacity. The orchestra was a resident organization of the Tobin Center for the Performing Arts in San Antonio. In August 2022, the orchestra's musicians reformed as the San Antonio Philharmonic, a name first used in 1914, and announced a ten-concert classical-music series for the 2022–23 season to be given at First Baptist Church of San Antonio, 100 yards from Tobin Center.

Artistic and organizational facts

The San Antonio Symphony presented a large and diverse selection of music on its concert schedule. The 2018–19 season included 14 different classical subscription programs (each performed twice), six Pops programs (also performed twice each), four different programs in a Young People's Concerts series (each performed between four and eight times), a Family Concert, a concert featuring the musical soundtrack with the screening of a major motion picture, and community outreach programs. Many orchestral concerts featured performances by guest artists. The group also presented soloists in recital, open rehearsals, and an annual string-instrument master class by a visiting guest artist.

The 2018–19 artistic staff of the San Antonio Symphony consisted of Music Director Sebastian Lang-Lessing, Assistant Conductor Noam Aviel, Mastersingers Conductor John Silantien, and 72 full-time musicians. The musicians collectively belonged to the International Conference of Symphony and Opera Musicians (ICSOM), and virtually all were (and remain) members of the American Federation of Musicians (AFM). The San Antonio Mastersingers is a chorus that performed frequently with the symphony. Its members participate on a volunteer basis. Each year the San Antonio Symphony was joined by the Philharmonic Orchestra of YOSA, Youth Orchestras of San Antonio, for a side-by-side concert. The organization was a member of the League of American Orchestras.

History

Early efforts (1887 to 1920s)

Orchestral music in San Antonio traces its beginnings to a series of four concerts by a 49-piece orchestra directed by German immigrant Carl Beck at the state Sängerfest in 1887. A performance of Felix Mendelssohn's Symphony No. 4 in these concerts was the first of a complete symphony in the state of Texas. Beck again conducted a symphony orchestra when the Sängerfest returned to San Antonio in 1896. He was engaged as the director of the Beethoven Männerchor in San Antonio, then succeeded in that role by Carl Hahn in about 1904. Hahn worked with Anna Goodman Hertzberg, a leading local musician and arts patron, to create the San Antonio Symphony Orchestra, which gave its first concert on May 18, 1905. The orchestra performed sporadically for the next several years but was revived in 1914 as the "San Antonio Philharmonic" by conductor Arthur Claassen. By 1916, the ensemble was again called the San Antonio Symphony Orchestra. By 1918 it was under the musical direction of Julien Paul Blitz.  Concerts continued into the 1920s, but the organization appears ultimately to have foundered.

1939 to 2022
The most recent San Antonio Symphony, an organization independent of the aforementioned predecessors, was created in 1939 by Max Reiter, a German-Italian immigrant, who became its first music director. The group's early ambition is evidenced by the fact that the legendary violinist Jascha Heifetz was a guest artist during the first season. By 1943, the orchestra employed 75 professional musicians, and in the 1944–45 season its budget topped $100,000, making it one of only 19 "major" orchestras in the country at that time, and the only one in Texas. Unlike many orchestras, the San Antonio Symphony was able to continue operations through World War II—largely because the city's strong military presence helped bolster the local economy. Before his death in 1950, Reiter started an Opera Festival, created an Opera Chorus, and brought nationwide attention to the orchestra, with world premieres by several important composers, guest appearances by world-class artists, and overall high musical quality.

Reiter was succeeded by Victor Alessandro, a native Texan. The orchestra continued to grow in scope, including the addition of Young People's Concerts. In 1969, it took up residence in the Theater for the Performing Arts (which was later renamed the Lila Cockrell Theatre). In 1967, the orchestra made its first major-label recordings, for Mercury Records. Alessandro died in 1976. Financial difficulties forced the cancellation of much of the 1987–88 season. During this time, the musicians formed and presented a concert series with their own organization, Orchestra San Antonio. The 1990s were highlighted by recognition and acclaim for the San Antonio Symphony's creative and culturally diverse programming, culminating in awards from the National Endowment for the Arts (NEA), the American Symphony Orchestra League (ASOL), the American Society of Composers, Authors, and Publishers (ASCAP), and the Knight Foundation.

The 2003–04 season was cancelled due to bankruptcy. In the early part of the 2006–07 season, the executive board chose not to renew music director Larry Rachleff's contract beyond the following season. The musicians and many San Antonio Symphony supporters opposed this decision. In January 2008, Christopher Seaman was appointed artistic adviser, a "position . . . similar to that of an interim music director" for one season. Sebastian Lang-Lessing became the orchestra's eighth music director in 71 years with a concert on October 2, 2010. Akiko Fujimoto became the first woman to hold a full-time conducting position on the orchestra's artistic staff when she was hired as its assistant conductor in 2011.

From 1939 to 2017 the Symphony Society of San Antonio managed the orchestra's operations. In 2017 these were turned over to Symphonic Music for San Antonio, also a nonprofit organization. But SMSA pulled out of this agreement in December 2017, leaving the organization in a poor position, and in January 2018, the bulk of the symphony's remaining 2017–18 season was canceled. With the help of a fundraising effort spearheaded by Kathleen Weir Vale, the remainder of the 2017–18 season was salvaged, and the Symphony Society returned as the governing body.

Demise
In September 2021, the musicians of the San Antonio Symphony called a strike in response to a contract proposal by the board and management that would have called for them to accept significant reductions in status, salary, and complement. Despite negotiations and arbitration throughout what would have been the 2021–22 season, no agreement was reached, and ultimately the entire season was canceled. During the spring of 2022, the musicians presented a series of orchestral concerts as the Musicians of the San Antonio Symphony (MOSAS). Lang-Lessing had held the title of Music Director Emeritus since 2020 but was stripped of that title when he announced that he would conduct a set of MOSAS performances.

San Antonio Philharmonic
On June 16, 2022, the board of the San Antonio Symphony voted unanimously to initiate Chapter 7 bankruptcy proceedings to effect the organization's dissolution. In August 2022, the San Antonio Philharmonic was created; its musicians comprise the former San Antonio Symphony membership.

Music directors

Musicians 
Members of the San Antonio Symphony with Wikipedia articles include:
 1971–1973: Robert L. Annis, clarinet
 1946–1947: Franz Benteler, violin
 1990–1993: Maximilian Dimoff, assistant principal and principal bass
 1948–1951: Julius Hegyi, concertmaster
 1952–1958: Eugene Lacritz, clarinet; Pops conductor, 1951–1958
 1952–1955: Eric Rosenblith, concertmaster
 1994–2007: Stephanie Sant'Ambrogio, concertmaster
 1939–19??: Bill Sinkin, violin
 1985–1987: Mark Sparks, principal flute
 1959–1964: Daniel Stolper, principal oboe
 1963–1964: Donald Weilerstein, concertmaster
 1949?–1966?: Clifton Williams, horn and guest conductor

See also
The Majestic Theatre, San Antonio

References

Sources
"Immigrant conductor founded symphony during war years." Allen, Paula. San Antonio Express-News, 27 March 2005.
International Who's Who in Music and Musical Gazetteer, ed. César Saerchinger. New York: Current Literature Publishing Company, 1918.
San Antonio Symphony, Season 07–08 (program book)
"San Antonio Symphony Orchestra." Albrecht, Theodore. The Handbook of Texas Online
Wolz, Larry. "Roots of Classical Music in Texas: The German Contribution." Chapter 5 of The Roots of Texas Music, ed. Lawrence Clayton and Joe W. Specht. College Station: Texas A&M University Press, 2003. .

External links
San Antonio Symphony Official website

1939 establishments in Texas
Musical groups established in 1939
Musical groups from San Antonio
Orchestras based in Texas
Texas classical music